This is a list of the European Routes, or E-road highways, that run through the Netherlands. The current network is signposted according to the 1985 system revision, and contains seven Class A roads and six Class B roads within the country. Almost without exception, these are motorways that also carry various national A-numbers (for Autosnelweg). Only two small stretches of the E25 and the E30 are provincial roads (the N220 and N211 respectively).

Description

History
The original E-road numbering of 1957 included ten routes, but was supplanted by the 1985 revision.

Class-A European routes

Class-B European routes

See also 
List of motorways in the Netherlands

References

External links

Rijkswaterstaat

 
E-roads
Netherlands